The Caution Zone was a backyard roller coaster built by Will Pemble in Orinda, California.

The coaster was 180 feet long, fifteen feet high and cost US$3500 to construct. It ran until 2015.

References

Former roller coasters in California